The Scharfschützengewehr 82 or SSG 82, literally Sharpshooter's Rifle 82, is a rifle chambered in the 5.45×39mm Soviet cartridge built in East Germany at the end of the Cold War for use by East German special police units.

Very little was known about this weapon and very few examples have been imported into the west, with importer Century International Arms having imported around 600 at the turn of the century. It's known that at least 2000 SSG 82s were made.

The SSG 82 actually was specifically designed for use in the Ministry for State Security (Stasi) to stop the import of police sniper rifles from non-socialist countries and military sniper rifles from socialist countries.

History
The development of the SSG 82 was done under the watch of Erich Mielke.

When Stasi HQ was occupied by activists, 10 SSG 82s were found and subsequently passed off to West Germany before they were passed on to gun collectors.

Design details 

The Scharfschützengewehr 82 was technically based on the Suhler Kleinkalibergewehr Modell 150 Standard .22 Long Rifle (5.6 mm) caliber small bore competition rifle. This makes the SSG 82 design reminiscent of a European-style small bore competition rifle.

There were plans to have the SSG 82 include a suppressor and a night vision scope, but they were called off.

Barreled action 
The heart of the SSG 82 is a cold-hammer forged receiver and free-floating barrel with a semi-bull profile and features a target crown.

The bolt has four locking lugs and requires a 60-degree bolt rotation to cycle the gun.

The safety consist of a sliding safety actuated by rotating a small disk positioned at the right side just above the trigger.
The detachable 5-round box magazine is based upon center feeding for maximum reliability as well as precise positioning of the cartridge into the chamber. The magazine release is located on the bottom right behind the magazine well.

Stock 
The SSG 82 wooden stock resembles that of the Small bore Standard rifle 150 with a raised comb and a stippled pistol grip and forearm. The butt plate is adjustable for length of pull by adding or removing spacers and height.

Sights 
The rifle has no iron sights but is equipped with a 4×32 telescopic sight ("Ziel4/S" 4×32 scope, reticle 1) with mounting rails made by VEB Zeiss Jena (in the original Zeiss plant that was captured by the Soviets at the end of WWII) which is numbered to the rifle and mounted using a quick detachable Suhler claw mountbase. This was a basic model of the VEB Zeiss Jena telescopic sight line as 6×36, 6×42M, 8×56M and variable 1.5–6×39, 1.5–6×42M and 3–12×56M magnification variants were also available. The Zeiss Jena non-M telescopic sight models had elevation correction and focusing turrets and were due to the lack of a windage correction turret corrected for windage by a gunsmith during mounting, hence these sights were dedicated to a particular rifle.

Precision 
Internet sources report differing information regarding the attainable accuracy of fire, though the quality of the ammunition used is often mentioned as a very important factor in obtaining good accuracy.

Reports on the accuracy of the rifle range from one hole 5-shot groups to  3-shot groups and anywhere in between.

Users
  – The SSG 82 was used by the Department XXII of the Ministry of State Security, the Stasi anti-terrorist service unit. Furthermore, bodyguards and forces of the Ministry of the Interior (MDI) as well as special forces of riot police were armed with this weapon. These service units possessed a high operational-tactical level of training and were intended for the prevention or combating of terrorist attacks, hostage-taking and terrorist attacks on the territory of East Germany.

References

External links

 "SSG 82" - deutsche Seite
 SSG-82: The Enigmatic East German Sniper Rifle

Sniper rifles of Germany
5.45×39mm bolt-action rifles